Temperanceville  may refer to the following places:

Temperanceville, Ontario, a neighbourhood in the northwestern part of Richmond Hill, Canada
Temperanceville, Arkansas, in Howard County, Arkansas, United States
Temperanceville, Ohio, an unincorporated community
Temperanceville, Pennsylvania, later renamed  West End (Pittsburgh)
Temperanceville, Virginia, a settlement in the northeastern part of Virginia, United States